Flavie Flament (née Lecanu, born 2 July 1974) is a French television and radio presenter.

Early life
She was born in Valognes, Normandy, the daughter of Jean-Paul Lecanu, a former  professional football player  (1970–1974) for Stade Malherbe de Caen, who subsequently worked for the SNCF. Her mother worked for the state's children-protection agency, Aide sociale à l'enfance (ASE). 

She has two older brothers, Olivier and Maxime.

In 1988, she was elected "Miss OK" in the show L'élection de Miss OK 88, broadcast on M6 and hosted by Marie-Pierre Lacq and Jean-Luc Delarue).

TV career
Flament began her career as a production assistant for the TV show Frou-Frou hosted by Christine Bravo on Antenne 2. She then worked for Philippe Alfonsi's production Ça déméninge! on La Cinquième.

In 1998, she became weather presenter on Canal + and then worked on the shows Un autre journal with Philippe Gildas, Unisex, and Toutes les Télés on M6.

In 2000, Flament hosted on a daily basis Exclusif on TF1, alongside Frédéric Joly, and Stars à domicile. From 2001 to 2005, she was presenting the live event Domino Day on TF1 (alongside Denis Brogniart and Dave).

Flament has hosted events and special programs on TF1 including L'homme le plus drôle de l'année, Les 500 Choristes ensemble, Tube d'un jour, tube de toujours, Sagas, Vis ma Vie and La Chanson de l'année. She hosted the daily program named Leçon de style, broadcast on TF1. These programs were sponsored by C&A, who had appointed Flavie Flament their brand ambassador. 

In 2009, Flament hosted Love and bluff on TF1.

Personal life
She has a child, named Antoine (born 1995), from her first marriage to director Bernard Flament.

On 21 September 2002, she married TV host Benjamin Castaldi, with whom she has a child, Enzo, born in 2004. They have since divorced. Her current companion is the director Pierre Quatrefages.

Flament has posed in the nude for Gala magazine.

In 2016, she accused British photographer David Hamilton of raping her when she was 13 years old. France’s statute of limitations on rape and sexual abuse did not allow for Hamilton's prosecution. Some weeks after Flament's book containing the accusation was published, the photographer, at age 83, committed suicide. Following Hamilton's death, the French minister for children's and women's rights asked Flament to lead a body that would consider extending the statute of limitations.

Publications
La consolation. Paris: JC Lattès, 2016. .

TV shows
 1999 : Toutes les Télés / M6
 1999 : Unisexe / M6
 2000-2001 : Exclusif / TF1, with Frédéric Joly
 2001-2005 : Domino Day / TF1, with Denis Brogniart and Dave
 2002-2004 : Stars à domicile / TF1
 2002-2004 : Tubes d'un jour, tubes de toujours / TF1
 2003 : Nice People / TF1, with Arthur
 2003-2004 : La soirée spéciale / TF1
 2006-2007 : Vis ma vie / TF1
 2004-2007 : Sagas / TF1
 2004-2008 : La chanson de l'année / TF1
 2004-2009 : Les disques d'or / TF1
 2005-2007 : Podium : l'émission des 40 ans de variétés / TF1
 2005-2009 : Les 500 choristes ensemble / TF1
 2005-2006 : L'homme le plus drôle de l'année / TF1
 2005-2009 : Médical détectives / TF6
 2006 : Balavoine, 20 ans déjà / TF1, with Jean-Pierre Foucault
 2006 : Les 40 couples stars qui font rêver les français / TF1, with Benjamin Castaldi
 2008 : Génération Cloclo / TF1
 2008 : Leçon de style / TF1
 2009 : Les disques d'or / TF1
 2009 : Love and Bluff / TF1
 2010 : Les Rois du casse / Jimmy
 2010 : L’Œil de Jimmy / Jimmy

Radio
 2010-2011 : Tout le plaisir est pour nous / RTL
 since 2011 : On est fait pour s'entendre / RTL

See also
 Benjamin Castaldi

References

External links 

 

1974 births
Living people
French television presenters
French women television presenters
People from Manche